Tracked in the Snow Country is a 1925 American silent drama film directed by Herman C. Raymaker, written by Edward J. Meagher and Herman C. Raymaker, and starring Rin Tin Tin, June Marlowe, David Butler, Mitchell Lewis, Charles Sellon, and Princess Lea. It was released by Warner Bros. on July 13, 1925.

Plot
As described in a film magazine reviews, the dog, Rin-Tin-Tin, is accused of having killed his master. Because the fallacy of the accusal hurts him, he escapes to the woods and joins a pack of wolves, with which he lives for a time. Later he finds the real murderer, captures him, and is declared innocent. He returns to live with his folks at home, where he fathers a litter of pups.

Cast
Rin Tin Tin as Rin Tin Tin
June Marlowe as Joan Hardy
David Butler as Terry Moulton 
Mitchell Lewis as Jules Renault
Charles Sellon as Silent Hardy
Princess Lea as Wah-Wah

Box office
According to Warner Bros. records, the film earned $278,000 domestically and $44,000 in foreign markets.

Preservation
The film exists in a print held by Cinemateket-Svenska Filminstitutet, Stockholm.

References

External links
 

1925 films
1920s English-language films
Warner Bros. films
American silent feature films
Silent American drama films
1925 drama films
American black-and-white films
Rin Tin Tin
Films directed by Herman C. Raymaker
1920s American films